Bert Allen may refer to:

Bert Allen (Australian footballer) (1887–1975), Richmond Football Club player
Bert Allen, character in The Lone Ranger (serial)

See also
Albert Allen (disambiguation)
Robert Allen (disambiguation)
Herbert Allen (disambiguation)
Hubert Allen (disambiguation)